Adam Skirving (1719 in Haddington, East LothianApril 1803) was a Scottish song writer known for Hey, Johnnie Cope, are Ye Waking Yet?.

Life
Skirving was born in 1719. He became a farmer at Garleton Castle, near Haddington, and this is where he was married twice. His eldest son Archibald Skirving painted portraits whilst his second son, Robert, inherited his mother's musical talents but went into the army. All three of these wrote verses but it is Adam who is best remembered as a song writer and his wife is credited with some of the tunes. Skirving was a farmer at "Prora" but he was not keen to write and spent much of his time playing golf, socialising and visiting the horse races.

Skirving died in April 1803. He was buried at Athelstaneford. His reputation rests on two Jacobite ballads on the Battle of Prestonpans, one of which, Hey, Johnnie Cope, are Ye Waking Yet?, whilst very far from an accurate narrative, is popular enough to be found in many collections of Scottish songs. Skirving wrote the words to a well known tune.

References

1719 births
1803 deaths
Scottish songwriters
People from Haddington, East Lothian